Margaret Victoria "Meg" Farris (born April 30, 1958) is the Medical Reporter at WWL-TV, the CBS affiliate in New Orleans, Louisiana, USA.  Farris began her career in journalism at WWL-TV in May 1981.  Prior to being promoted to Medical Reporter at WWL-TV, Farris worked as a Desk Assistant, Assistant Assignment Editor and Satellite Coordinator.

Meg Farris grew up in New Orleans, Louisiana.  Farris has a Bachelor of Arts degree in journalism from the University of Mississippi.

References

External links
 Meg Farris, FaceBook Public Figure
 Meg Farris, Twitter, Medical Reporter for WWL-TV

1958 births
American women journalists
Living people
New Orleans television reporters
University of Mississippi alumni